Bob Breitenstein may refer to:

 Bob Breitenstein (American football coach) (1913–2002), head football coach for the Appalachian State Mountaineers, 1959
 Bob Breitenstein (offensive lineman) (born 1943), professional American football player